Urayoán Noel is a translator, poet, and critic who is the author of poetry collections, poetry criticism and books. He has received fellowships from the Ford Foundation, the Bronx Council on the Arts, the Howard Foundation, and CantoMundo (where Noel has been both fellow and faculty).

Early life and education
Originally from San Juan, Puerto Rico, he has a PhD (Spanish) from New York University, 2008; an M.A. (Spanish) from Stanford University, 1999; and a B.A. (English) from Universidad de Puerto Rico.

Career
Noel is an associate professor of English and Spanish at NYU. In addition, he is a contributing editor at Obsidian: Literature and Arts in the African Diaspora,  NACLA Report on the Americas, and Mandorla: New Writing from the Americas.

Noel's poetry and criticism is widely published. His work appears in Bomb, Contemporary Literature, Lana Turner, Latino Studies, Small Axe Project, CENTRO: Journal of the Center for Puerto Rican Studies, Revista de Estudios Hispánicos, Liminalities: A Journal of Performance Studies, American Literary History, and Comparative Literature Studies.

Noel is the author of several poetry collections, including his debut collection Kool Logic/La lógica kool, Boringkén, Hi-Density Politics, and Buzzing Hemisphere/Rumor Hemisférico, focused on the "promotion of hemispheric politics and poetics, along with its interrogation of technology's structural and narrative interventions into diasporic cultures." Critic Kristin Dykstra notes that "Taken collectively the books produce a historic meditation that collides with, and intensifies, the frenetic energies emphasizing the immediacy of urban life." Noel's poetry has been honored with a Library Journal Top Fall Indie Poetry selection and a National Book Critics Circle Small Press Highlights selection.

The author's work as both editor and critic has received numerous plaudits. 2014's In Visible Movement: Nuyorican Poetry from the Sixties to Slam was the winner of the 2015/2016 Best Book Award from the Latino Studies Section of the Latin American Studies Association and received an honorable mention in the MLA Prize in Latina/o and Chicana/o Literary and Cultural Studies. Noel edited and translated Pablo de Rokha's Architecture of Dispersed Life: Selected Poetry (Shearsman Books, 2018). This book was later longlisted for the Best Translated Book Award, sponsored by Open Letter Books at the University of Rochester.

Personal life
Noel lives in the Bronx where he was awarded a BRIO fellowship from the Bronx Council on the Arts.

Selected bibliography

Selected poems
Death and Taxesfrom Kool Logic (Bilingual Press/Editorial Bilingüe, 2005)

In the Faraway Suburbsfrom Kool Logic (Bilingual Press/Editorial Bilingüe, 2005)

ode to coffee oda al caféfrom PoetryNow(2016)

No Longer Odefrom Poem-a-Dayon August 13, 2018, by the Academy of American Poets.

References

Living people
American critics
American male poets
New York University alumni
New York University faculty
Stanford University alumni
People from San Juan, Puerto Rico
University of Puerto Rico alumni
1976 births